Modern Age is an American conservative academic quarterly journal, founded in 1957 by Russell Kirk in close collaboration with Henry Regnery. Originally published independently in Chicago, in 1976 ownership was transferred to the Intercollegiate Studies Institute.

History 
With its founding Kirk hoped for "a dignified forum for reflective, traditionalist conservatism" and the magazine has remained one of the voices of intellectual, small-"c" conservatism to the present day.

Reflecting the ideals of its founder, in its politics it is traditionalist, localist, against most military interventions, not libertarian, anti-Straussian, and generally critical of neoconservatism. In its religious sympathies it adheres to orthodoxy, whether Roman Catholic, Jewish, Eastern Orthodox, or Protestant.

Modern Age has been described by the historian George H. Nash as "the principal quarterly of the intellectual right."

Paul Gottfried, a professor at Elizabethtown College in Pennsylvania, has said that "Modern Age represents humanistic learning, reverence for the eternal, and the sense of human finiteness, values that (alas) have less and less to do with the academic presentation of the liberal arts."

Kirk edited the publication from 1957 to 1959.  Eugene Davidson edited it from 1960 to 1969. David S. Collier was the quarterly's third editor, from 1970 to 1983. Modern Age fourth editor was George A. Panichas who served from 1984 to 2007. The next editor was R. V. Young. Peter Lawler replaced Young in 2017. Lawler died later in 2017 and he was replaced by the current editor, Daniel McCarthy.

Masthead 
The journal's Executive Editor is Mark Henrie, its Managing Editor is Arthur Bloom, and its Poetry Editor is James Matthew Wilson. Associate Editors include George W. Carey, Jude P. Dougherty, Jeffrey Hart, Marion Montgomery, Mordecai Roshwald, and Stephen J. Tonsor.

Contributors 
Contributors:
Russell Kirk
R. V. Young
Jeffrey Hart
Thomas Molnar
Mordecai Roshwald
Paul Gottfried
Paul Hollander
Irving Louis Horowitz
Carol Iannone
E. Christian Kopff
W. Julian Korab-Karpowicz
Peter Augustine Lawler
Claes G. Ryn
Ellis Sandoz
R. J. Stove
Peter Lawler
Revilo P. Oliver
Michael D. Aeschliman

See also

 Paleoconservatism

References

External links

Russell Kirk's lead editorial from the first issue, Summer, 1957. Apology for a New Review
The Modern Age Archive courtesy of the Intercollegiate Studies Institute's First Principles web log

Conservative magazines published in the United States
Political magazines published in the United States
Quarterly magazines published in the United States
Magazines established in 1957
Magazines published in Chicago
Paleoconservatism